The 2016 United States presidential election  was held on November 8, 2016, as part of the 2016 General Election in which all 50 states plus the District of Columbia participated. South Carolina voters chose electors to represent them in the Electoral College via a popular vote pitting the Republican Party's nominee, businessman Donald Trump, and running mate Indiana Governor Mike Pence against Democratic Party nominee, former Secretary of State Hillary Clinton and her running mate, Virginia Senator Tim Kaine.

Out of 3.12 million registered voters, 2.10 million voted, a turnout of 67.86%. Trump continued the Republican tradition in South Carolina, carrying the state with 54.9% of the vote. Clinton received 40.7% of the vote, underperforming Barack Obama's 2012 performance by about 4%. Trump became the first Republican to win the White House without carrying Charleston County since Dwight Eisenhower in 1956.

Primary elections 

The former President of the United States, Barack Obama, a Democrat and former U.S. Senator from Illinois, was first elected president in the 2008 election, running with former Senator Joe Biden of Delaware. Defeating the Republican nominee, Senator John McCain of Arizona, with 52.9% of the popular vote and 68% of the electoral vote, Obama succeeded two-term Republican President George W. Bush, the former Governor of Texas. Obama and Biden were reelected in the 2012 presidential election, defeating former Massachusetts Governor Mitt Romney with 51.1% of the popular vote and 61.7% of electoral votes. Although Barack Obama's approval rating in the RealClearPolitics poll tracking average remained between 40 and 50% for most of his second term, it has experienced a surge in early 2016 and reached its highest point since 2012 during June of that year. Analyst Nate Cohn has noted that a strong approval rating for President Obama would equate to a strong performance for the Democratic candidate, and vice versa.

Following his second term, President Obama was not eligible for another reelection. In October 2015, Obama's running-mate and 2-term Vice President Biden decided not to enter the race for the Democratic presidential nomination either. With their terms expiring on January 20, 2017, the electorate was asked to elect a new president, the 45th president and 48th vice president of the United States, respectively.

On February 20 and 27, 2016, in the presidential primaries, South Carolina voters expressed their preferences for the Republican and Democratic parties' respective nominees for president. Registered members of each party could only vote in their party's primary, while voters who were unaffiliated could choose any one primary in which to vote.

Democratic primary 

The 59 delegates for the Democratic National Convention from South Carolina are allocated in this way. There are 53 pledged delegates and 6 unpledged delegates. For the pledged delegates, each district gets 5 delegates that are allocated proportionally. There are then 18 at-large delegates awarded proportionally.

Republican primary 

Delegates from South Carolina to the Republican National Convention are awarded in this way. 29 delegates are awarded to the candidate that wins the plurality of the vote in the South Carolina primary. The remaining 21 delegates are allocated by giving the winner of each of the seven congressional districts 3 delegates.

Green state convention 

On April 30, the Green Party of South Carolina held its state convention. The public was welcome, but only members and delegates were eligible to vote.

On April 30, it was announced that William Kreml had won the primary.

General election

Voting History 

South Carolina has generally been reckoned to be a solidly red state ever since it voted for Barry Goldwater in 1964. From 1964 on, the Republican ticket has carried the Palmetto State in every election apart from 1976, when the state voted for Jimmy Carter, from neighboring Georgia. The state even spurned Southern Democrat Bill Clinton in both his elections, in each of which he carried several other Southern states. The state has not had a Democratic Senator since Ernest Hollings retired in 2005, and it has had a Republican majority in its Congressional delegation since the so-called "Republican Revolution" of 1994. Four years prior to the 2016 election, in 2012, Republican Mitt Romney defeated Barack Obama by 10.5%.

However, in 2016 some commentators suggested that South Carolina might become a battleground state due to polling suggesting Republican dissatisfaction with Trump, as well as the growing effects of in-migration from other states (as in formerly solidly red Virginia and North Carolina). A poll released on August 10 by Public Policy Polling had Trump leading Clinton by a margin of only 2 points, and an internal poll commissioned for the South Carolina Democratic Party had the race tied. This led Larry Sabato's political prediction website Sabato's Crystal Ball to move the rating of the South Carolina contest from "Safe Republican" to "Likely Republican" on August 18. In the end, however, Trump carried the state by a comfortable 14.3% margin.

Predictions
CNN: Solid Trump
Cook Political Report: Likely Trump
Electoral-vote.com: Leans Trump
Los Angeles Times: Solid Trump
NBC: Leans Trump
RealClearPolitics: Leans Trump
Sabato's Crystal Ball: Safe Trump

Polling

Republican Donald Trump won every pre-election poll, but by varying margins. The last pre-election poll showed Donald Trump leading Clinton 47% to 36%. The average of all polls showed Trump leading 46.2% to 38%.

Results

By congressional district
Trump won 6 of 7 congressional districts.

By county

Counties that flipped from Democratic to Republican
Barnwell (largest city: Barnwell)
Calhoun (largest town: St. Matthews)
Chester (largest city: Chester)
Colleton (largest city: Walterboro)
Darlington (largest city: Hartsville)
McCormick (largest town: McCormick)

Electors

Technically the voters of South Carolina cast their ballots for electors: representatives to the Electoral College. South Carolina is allocated 9 electors because it has 7 congressional districts and 2 senators. All candidates who appear on the ballot or qualify to receive write-in votes must submit a list of 9 electors, who pledge to vote for their candidate and his or her running mate. Whoever wins the majority of votes in the state is awarded all 9 electoral votes. Their chosen electors then vote for president and vice president. Although electors are pledged to their candidate and running mate, they are not obligated to vote for them. An elector who votes for someone other than his or her candidate is known as a faithless elector.

The electors of each state and the District of Columbia met on December 19, 2016, to cast their votes for president and vice president. The Electoral College itself never meets as one body. Instead the electors from each state and the District of Columbia met in their respective capitols.

The following were the members of the Electoral College from the state. All 9 were pledged for Trump/Pence.

 Glenn McCall
 Matt Moore
 Terry Hardesty
 Jim Ulmer
 Brenda Bedenbaugh
 Bill Conley
 Shery Smith
 Moye Graham
 Jerry Rovner

References

External links
 RNC 2016 Republican Nominating Process 
 Green papers for 2016 primaries, caucuses, and conventions

SC
2016
Presidential